Sergio Siorpaes (born 20 July 1934, in Cortina d'Ampezzo) is an Italian bobsledder who competed from the late 1950s to the mid-1960s. At the 1964 Winter Olympics in Innsbruck, he won bronze medals in the two-man and four-man events.

Siorpaes also won seven medals at the FIBT World Championships with five golds (Two-man: 1961, 1963, 1966; Four-man: 1960, 1961) and two silvers (Two-man: 1958, 1959).

References
 Bobsleigh two-man Olympic medalists 1932-56 and since 1964
 Bobsleigh four-man Olympic medalists for 1924, 1932-56, and since 1964
 Bobsleigh two-man world championship medalists since 1931
 Bobsleigh four-man world championship medalists since 1930
 DatabaseOlympics.com profile
 

1934 births
People from Cortina d'Ampezzo
Bobsledders at the 1964 Winter Olympics
Italian male bobsledders
Olympic bobsledders of Italy
Olympic bronze medalists for Italy
Living people
Olympic medalists in bobsleigh
Medalists at the 1964 Winter Olympics
Sportspeople from the Province of Belluno